The Ministry of Investment Promotion of the Republic of Somaliland (MoIP) (Arabic:وزارة تطوير الاستثمار)  is a Somaliland government ministry, tasked and primarily responsible to facilitate both local and foreign investment schemes and encourage the investment opportunities through, promotion, media coverage and employing research and development strategy, the current minister is Mohamed Ahmed Mohamoud.

See also

 Ministry of Livestock & Fisheries (Somaliland)
 Ministry of Commerce (Somaliland)
 Ministry of Finance (Somaliland)

References

External links
 Somaliland Investment Promotion Ministry

Politics of Somaliland
Government ministries of Somaliland